The 1993 European Cup was the 29th edition of the European Cup, IIHF's premier European club ice hockey tournament. The season started on October 8, 1993, and finished on December 30, 1993.

The tournament was won by TPS, who beat Dynamo Moscow in the final. (( Mike Gregorio, Goalie))

First group round

Group A
(Esbjerg, Denmark)

Group A standings

Group B
(Trenčín, Slovakia)

Group  standings

Group C
(Jesenice, Slovenia)

Group C standings

Group D
(Riga, Latvia)

Group D standings

Group E
(Budapest, Hungary)

Group E standings

 Podhale Nowy Targ,
 HC Devils Milano,
 Rouen HC,
 EHC Kloten,
 TPS,
 Dynamo Moscow,  Brynäs IF   :  bye

Second group round

Group F
(Milan, Italy)

Group F standings

Group G
(Rouen, France)

Group G standings

Group H
(Kloten, Canton of Zürich, Switzerland)

Group H standings

Group I
(Turku, Finland)

Group I standings

 Malmö IF,
 Düsseldorfer EG   :  bye

Final stage
(Düsseldorf, North Rhine-Westphalia, Germany)

Third round

Group A

Group A standings

Group B

Group B standings

Third place match

Final

References
 Season 1993

1
IIHF European Cup